Grete Salomonsen is a Norwegian director of family films. She is probably best known for directing Kamilla and the Thief (1988), its sequel and Yohan: The Child Wanderer (2010) produced by Penelopefilm AS.  The first film she directed for the big screen was PIPP, a film for very young children.

References

External links
 

Year of birth missing (living people)
Living people
Norwegian film directors
Norwegian women film directors